Blockade is a 2005 documentary film by Sergei Loznitsa. The film was shot with no dialogue and consists of black and white footage shot during the Siege of Leningrad. It has a run time of 52 minutes.

Reception
Blockade has a score of 70 out of 100 on Metacritic, based on 5 critics, indicating "generally favorable reviews".

References 
'A Chronicle for Our Time, Loznitsa's Blockade - Denise J. Youngblood, Russian Review 66,  October 2007

External links 
 Icarus films
 harvardfilmarchiveloznitsa

2005 films
2005 documentary films
Documentary films about World War II
Eastern Front of World War II films
Documentary films about the Soviet Union
History of Saint Petersburg
Films directed by Sergei Loznitsa